Mișcarea Literară (Romanian for "The Literary Movement") was a literary and art weekly published in Romania from 1924 to 1925 by writer Liviu Rebreanu and poet Alexandru Dominic. 

A new magazine with the same title was published, starting 2002 in the city of Bistrița.

References

 Patronul spiritual - Liviu Rebreanu 
 Modernismul 

Defunct literary magazines published in Europe
Defunct magazines published in Romania
Magazines established in 1924
Magazines disestablished in 1925
Visual arts magazines published in Romania
Literary magazines published in Romania
Romanian-language magazines
Weekly magazines published in Romania